Chapra Bangaljhi Mahavidyalaya, is a general degree college at Bangaljhi, Chapra in Nadia district. It offers undergraduate courses in arts. It is affiliated to University of Kalyani.

Departments

Arts

Bengali (Honours & General)
English (Honours & General)
Sanskrit (Honours & General)
History (Honours & General)
Geography (Honours & General)
Political Science (Honours & General)
Philosophy (Honours & General)
Education (Honours & General)
Physical Education (Only General)
Sociology (Honours & General)
Science

See also

References

External links
NEW WEBSITE OF THE COLLEGE
University of Kalyani
University Grants Commission
National Assessment and Accreditation Council

Universities and colleges in Nadia district
Colleges affiliated to University of Kalyani
Educational institutions established in 2001
2001 establishments in West Bengal